Abraham Hermanus de Vries (born 9 February 1937) is an Afrikaans short story writer, considered one of the most respected and beloved in Afrikaans language literature in the Sestigers.

Early life and career
De Vries was born in Ladismith in the then Cape Province in 1937. He studied at Stellenbosch University and the Gemeentelijke Universiteit van Amsterdam, and obtained doctorates from both universities. From 1963 to 1965 he was the art editor for Die Vaderland, a Johannesburg newspaper. He regularly toured overseas and also lectured at different European universities. De Vries was awarded numerous literary prizes, including the Reina Prinsen Geerligs Prize for his first three books, the Eugène Marais Prize for Vliegoog, the Perskor Prize for Briekwa, the De Kat/Potpourri Prize for Die Bruid, and the RAU-prys for creative work in 2004.

Bibliography

 1956 — Hoog teen die heuningkrans
 1957 — Verlore erwe
 1959 — Proegoed
 1961 — Vetkers en neonlig
 1963 — Dubbeldoor
 1965 — Die rustelose sjalom
 1965 — Vliegoog
 1966 — Afspraak met eergister; Griekse reisjoernaal, Oktober 1965 tot April 1966
 1966 — Dorp in die Klein Karoo
 1966 — Kruispad; ’n novelle
 1968 — Joernaal uit ’n gragtehuis
 1969 — Twee maal om die son
 1972 — Volmoed se gasie
 1973 — Briekwa
 1975 — Bliksoldate bloei nie
 1977 — Die Klein Karoo; ’n legkaart (photographs by Paul Alberts)
 1978 — Die Afrikaanse kortverhaalboek, (compiler)
 1980 — Kort keur, (compiler)
 1980 — Die uur van die idiote
 1983 — Kortom: gids by die Afrikaanse kortverhaalboek
 1986 — Literêre dagboek, (compiler)
 1987 — Soms op ’n reis
 1989 — Kortom II: ’n inleiding by die Afrikaanse kortverhaalboek
 1989 — Nag van die clown
 1989 — Steekbaard: die beste Afrikaanse hondestories
 1994 — ’n Plaaswinkel naby oral
 1996 — Eeu: honderd jaar van Afrikaanse kortverhale, (samesteller)
 1997 — Skaduwees tussen skaduwees
 2000 — Uit die kontreie vandaan
 2002 — Op die wye oop Karoo: plaaswinkelstories uit die Klein Karoo
 2003 — Tot verhaal kom
 2005 — Verhale uit ’n koel voorhuis: die Klein Karoo eersteling
 2006 — Rooikoos Willemse is soek
 2006 — Onder hoë sterre
 2009 — Verbeel jou dis somer
 2011 — Die behoue huis: 'n keur uit die kortverhale van Abraham H de Vries
 2013 — Maar wie snoei die rose in die nag?

References

1937 births
Living people
Sestigers
Afrikaans-language writers